James Matthew Toohey (18 March 1850 – 25 September 1895) was a brewer and politician in the Colony of New South Wales.

Early life

He was born in Melbourne to businessman Matthew Toohey and Honora Hall, his middle name referring to Father Mathew, the Irish apostle of temperance. On 5 June 1873 he married Catherine Magdalene Ferris, with whom he had twelve children.

Brewing
In 1870, aged 20, he opened a brewing business with his brother John. The brewery was successful, moving to larger premises in 1873 and again in 1876, and would eventually become the public company Tooheys.

Politics
He stood as a candidate for the New South Wales Legislative Assembly for district of South Sydney at the 1885 election. On the major issues of the election, he noted that it scarcely needed to be said that he was opposed to the local option, put forward by the teetotallers to reduce the consumption of alcohol, stating that "people will not be made total abstainers by Act of Parliament". He praised the despatch of the New South Wales Contingent to the Sudan, describing it as "a huge advertisement for the colony", and that tariffs needed to be altered so as to protect local manufacturers. He has no position on the Land Bill, describing it as "a thing no fellow can understand". He was elected second with 16.1% of the vote, holding it until he resigned in 1893. Toohey said that his resignation was in protest at the failure of the Protectionist Dibbs government to implement principles of protection. He did not hold ministerial or other parliamentary position. Such was his antipathy for Dibbs he ran against him as an independent protectionist candidate for Tamworth at the 1894 election, however Toohey polled poorly with just 35 votes (2.5%) and Dibbs won the seat.

Death
His body was returned to Sydney for a funeral at St Mary's Cathedral, and he was buried in Rookwood Cemetery. He was succeeded in the brewing business by his eldest son, John Thomas.

References

 

1850 births
1895 deaths
Members of the New South Wales Legislative Assembly
Protectionist Party politicians
19th-century Australian politicians
Australian brewers
Australian company founders